The House at 19–21 Salem Street in Wakefield, Massachusetts is an unusual 18th-century two-family residence.  It is composed of two different houses that were conjoined c. 1795.  The left house has a gabled roof and asymmetrical window placement, while the right house has a gambrel roof and an early 20th-century entry hood. It is probable that both houses were built by Joseph Gould, who occupied the eastern of the two houses, between 1765 and 1795.  Despite subsequent alterations, the Georgian/Federal styling of the building remains apparent.

The house was listed on the National Register of Historic Places in 1989.

See also
National Register of Historic Places listings in Wakefield, Massachusetts
National Register of Historic Places listings in Middlesex County, Massachusetts

References

Houses completed in the 18th century
Houses on the National Register of Historic Places in Wakefield, Massachusetts
Georgian architecture in Massachusetts
Houses in Wakefield, Massachusetts